Rady or El-Rady is a surname. Notable people with the surname include: 

Elsa Rady (1943–2011), American ceramist
Martyn Rady (born 1955), British historian
Michael Rady (born 1981), American actor
Osama El-Rady (1930–2005), Saudi Arabian psychiatrist
Pheak Rady (born 1989), Cambodian footballer

Given name
Rady Mom (born 1970), Cambodian American politician
Rady Panov (born 1993), Bulgarian Canadian actor